Kraljevci  may refer to:

 Kraljevci, Serbia
 Kraljevci, Slovenia